TVHS may refer to:
 Table View High School, Cape Town, South Africa
 Tanque Verde High School, Tanque Verde, Arizona, United States
 Tech Valley High School, Rensselaer, New York, United States
 Temecula Valley High School, Temecula, California, United States
 Thompson Valley High School, Loveland, Colorado, United States
 Tobique Valley High School, Plaster Rock, New Brunswick, Canada
 Tonopah Valley High School, Tonopah, Arizona, United States
 Tuscarawas Valley High School, Zoarville, Ohio, United States
 Twin Valley High School (Pennsylvania), Elverson, Pennsylvania, United States
 Twin Valley High School (Virginia), Pilgrim Knob, Virginia, United States